Kimberly Sue Jackson (born August 25, 1984) is an American politician and Episcopal priest from the state of Georgia. A member of the Democratic Party, Jackson has represented the 41st district in the Georgia State Senate since January 2021. As a lesbian, she is Georgia's first openly LGBT+ state senator.

She was the first out priest of color to be ordained in the Episcopal Diocese of Atlanta. She serves as a vicar at the Church of the Common Ground, giving services for the homeless. She has also been a college chaplain, a consultant, a parish priest, and an activist.

Early life and education
Jackson was born in Elkins, West Virginia and grew up near Cowpens, South Carolina and was initially Baptist. She studied at Furman University, graduating in 2006, and later graduated from Candler School of Theology at Emory University with a Master of Divinity (M.Div.). She moved to Atlanta at the age of 22.

Personal life
Jackson is a lesbian. She lives on a farm in Stone Mountain with her wife, Trina, an imam.

References

External links
 Profile at the Georgia State Senate
 Campaign website

Living people
American Episcopal priests
Candidates in the 2020 United States elections
Candler School of Theology alumni
Furman University alumni
Lesbian politicians
LGBT Anglican clergy
LGBT state legislators in Georgia (U.S. state)
Democratic Party Georgia (U.S. state) state senators
People from Spartanburg County, South Carolina
University and college chaplains in America
LGBT people from South Carolina
21st-century American politicians
21st-century American women politicians
21st-century American Episcopalians
21st-century Anglican priests
Women Anglican clergy
People from Elkins, West Virginia
LGBT people from West Virginia
Converts to Anglicanism from Baptist denominations
21st-century American clergy
1984 births